The 1930 Chicago Cardinals season was their 11th in the league. The team failed to improve on their previous output of 6–6–1, winning only five games. They finished seventh in the league. The team played its first six games on the road and played seven games in the month of October.

Schedule

Standings

References

Arizona Cardinals seasons
Chicago Cardinals
Chicago